San Mateo County's Pescadero Creek Park is located near Loma Mar and is operated by the San Mateo County Department of Parks. The park complex of  also includes the neighboring Memorial, Sam McDonald and Heritage Grove parks. The park borders Portola Redwoods State Park with seamless trails, and connects to Big Basin Redwoods State Park via a trail easement across private lands.

History
In the 1970s there had been a plan to dam and flood the valley, but that was opposed by the general public. Then a plan by the county to develop the park with facilities such as campgrounds, visitor center, picnic grounds, trails and interpretive programs was also opposed and cancelled. So, the park is fairly undeveloped with basic campsites and trails developed originally by Scouts, plus the original logging roads now left as fire roads.

Setting

Today, the park is part of a larger group of county parks known as the Pescadero-Memorial Park Complex, formed by nearby land acquisitions:
 Memorial Park (1924)
 Sam McDonald County Park (acquired 1958, established 1970)
 Heritage Grove Redwood Preserve
 Pescadero Creek County Park (acquired 1968)
They are adjacent to Portola Redwoods State Park and close to several areas preserved by the Midpeninsula Regional Open Space District, including the Russian Ridge Open Space Preserve and the Skyline Ridge Open Space Preserve.

Pescadero Creek Park sits atop a deposit of natural gas and oil. Natural gas occasionally bubbles up through seams near Hoffman Creek producing a strong gas odor. Crude oil pools up in the channel of Tarwater Creek, and seeps into Jones Gulch Creek staining the rocks.

Pescadero Creek
The park is dominated by the Pescadero Creek, which provides winter habitat for steelhead trout, and a redwood forest with 26 miles of trails. Horseback riding is also popular here, and many use Jack Brook Horse Camp in San McDonald Park to connect. Hike-in camps are available to backpackers. Hiking trails that cross the Pescadero Creek do not have bridges (stepping stones provided), though the fire road crossings are bridged.

Tributaries of Pescadero Creek in this park are:

Schenly Creek
Towne Creek
Jones Gulch (San Mateo County)
Harwood Creek
Parke Gulch
Dark Gulch
Carriger Creek
Keyston Creek
Tarwater Creek
Rhododendron Creek
Wally's Creek
Shingle Mill Creek
Hooker Creek
Fall Creek
Iverson Creek

References

External links
 

Parks in San Mateo County, California
Regional parks in California